The Jean-Montet Quasar 200 was a single-seat aerobatic competition aircraft designed and amateur-built in France in the early 1980s. Only one was completed; it won one aerobatic competition and was destroyed less than three years later.

Design and development
The Quasar was designed and built by Jean, Pierre and Phillipe Montet. It was one of many designs developed from the available plans of the successful Stephens Akro aerobatic competitor of 1967.  They were both mid-wing monoplanes with angular flying surfaces, including cantilever wings and wire-braced tailplanes, and with fixed, cantilever tail wheel undercarriages. With a greater wingspan and a more powerful Lycoming flat-four engine, the  IO-360-A the Quasar was heavier than the Akro A.

The Quasar first flew on 10 September 1981.  On 19 September 1982, Pierre Montet flew the Quasar to win the Marcel Doret Cup for aerobatics at Moulins. It was destroyed on 1 April 1985, at its home airfield in Étampes.

Specifications

References

1980s French sport aircraft
Aerobatic aircraft
Mid-wing aircraft
Single-engined tractor aircraft
Aircraft first flown in 1981